Mandaitivu (Manḍativ) is an island off the coast of the Jaffna Peninsula in northern Sri Lanka, located approximately  south of the city of Jaffna.

Mandaitivu is connected to the Jaffna Peninsula and the neighbouring island of Velanaitivu by a causeway.

See also
 Mandaitivu massacre
 Battle of Mandaitivu

References

Islands of Jaffna District
Island South DS Division